They Might Be Giants is a 1971 American comedy mystery film based on the 1961 play of the same name (both written by James Goldman) starring George C. Scott and Joanne Woodward. Sometimes mistakenly described as a Broadway play, it never in fact opened in the United States. It was directed in London by Joan Littlewood in 1961, but Goldman believed that he "never got the play right" and forbade further productions or publication of the script. To coincide with the film's release, he authorized an illustrated paperback tie-in edition of the screenplay, published by Lancer Books.

The film's title was later adopted as the name of a popular music group.

Plot

Justin Playfair (Scott) is a judge who retreats into fantasy after his wife's death, imagining himself to be Sherlock Holmes, the legendary fictional detective. Complete with deerstalker hat, pipe and violin, he spends his days in a homemade criminal laboratory obsessing over plots hatched by his (Holmes's) archenemy, Professor Moriarty.

When his brother (Lester Rawlins) tries to place Justin under observation in a mental institution so he can get power of attorney, Justin attracts the attention of Dr. Mildred Watson (Woodward), a psychiatrist who becomes fascinated by his case. Justin demonstrates to her a knack for what Holmes describes as "deduction" (technically better categorized as abductive reasoning) and walks out of the institution during the ensuing confusion. Intrigued, Watson comes to his home to attempt treatment. Playfair is initially dismissive of Watson's attempts to psychoanalyze him and he analyzes her instead, but when he hears her name, he enthusiastically incorporates her into his life as Doctor Watson, the sidekick to his Holmes.

The duo begin an enigmatic quest for Moriarty, with Playfair/Holmes following all manner of bizarre and (to Watson) unintelligible clues, and encountering a rich tapestry of individualistic persons in assorted urban situations, the two growing closer to each other in the process.

Cast

 George C. Scott as Justin
 Joanne Woodward as Watson
 Jack Gilford as Peabody
 Lester Rawlins as Blevins
 Al Lewis as Messenger
 Rue McClanahan as Daisy
 Ron Weyand as Dr. Strauss
 Oliver Clark as Mr. Small
 Theresa Merritt as Peggy 
 Michael McGuire as Telephone Guard
 Eugene Roche as Policeman
 James Tolkan as Mr. Brown
 Kitty Winn as Grace
 Sudie Bond as Maud
 Staats Cotsworth as Winthrop
 F. Murray Abraham as Clyde
 Paul Benedict as Chestnut Man
 M. Emmet Walsh as 1st Sanitation Man
 Louis Zorich as 2nd Sanitation Man

Defining quote
The title is an indirect reference to Don Quixote's famous exploit of tilting at windmills, believing them to be "monstrous giants". Despite the protest of his aide Sancho Panza and being soundly defeated at the hands of the "giants" (that is, being tossed away by a mill's sail after getting his lance caught in it), Quixote maintains his belief that the mills are not buildings but giants. In reference to this, the character Playfair argues:

Of course, he carried it a bit too far. He thought that every windmill was a giant. That's insane. But, thinking that they might be... Well, all the best minds used to think the world was flat. But, what if it isn't? It might be round. And bread mold might be medicine. If we never looked at things and thought of what they might be, why, we'd all still be out there in the tall grass with the apes.

Critical views
The film opened to mixed reviews. Vincent Canby of The New York Times called it "a mushy movie with occasional, isolated moments of legitimate comedy." On Rotten Tomatoes it has an approval rating 73% based on reviews from 11 critics.

Releases
The original release length was 98 minutes. Netflix's streaming version, the Kino Blu-ray, and the Anchor Bay DVD released in 2000 are just over 91 minutes. A version edited for television in 1986 was 96:29. The currently available made-on-demand DVD runs slightly over 87 minutes. None of the home video releases include the full film. The largest missing material is a long sequence near the end that takes place in a grocery store. Powerhouse Films will release the film on Blu-ray under their Indicator label in January 2023, which was announced to include all three cuts of the film, but actually contains only the 91 minutes US cut and the 86 minutes UK cut.

References

External links

 
 
 
 
 

1971 films
1971 comedy films
1970s American films
1970s comedy mystery films
1970s English-language films
American comedy mystery films
American films based on plays
Films directed by Anthony Harvey
Films produced by John Foreman (producer)
Films scored by John Barry (composer)
Films set in New York City
Films shot in New York City
Films with screenplays by James Goldman
Sherlock Holmes films
Universal Pictures films